Los Ranchitos (Spanish for The Little Ranches) is an unincorporated community in Marin County, California, United States. It lies at an elevation of 66 feet (20 m).

Los Ranchitos was developed in 1949 into lots of at least one acre in size, with most averaging 1-2 acres. There are covenants on record describing allowable use of the lots, as well as a Los Ranchitos Improvement Association, which has been continuously active since the 1950s.  It does have a distinctly rural feel and is zoned agricultural and light farming with many lots having stables, horses, chickens, and goats.  As an unincorporated area, it falls under county jurisdiction and the area serves as a regional community separator between San Rafael and Terra Linda. It also shares boundaries with San Rafael's Open Space, administered by the Marin County Open Space District, and is actively used as a major wildlife corridor.

External links
 http://www.losranchitos.org

References

Unincorporated communities in California
Unincorporated communities in Marin County, California